Scottsdale Airport  is a municipal airport located  north of downtown Scottsdale, in Maricopa County, Arizona, United States. Most U.S. airports use the same three-letter location identifier for the FAA and IATA, but Scottsdale Airport is SDL to the FAA and SCF to the IATA (which assigned SDL to Midlanda Airport in Sundsvall, Sweden).

Federal Aviation Administration records say the airport had 4,798 passenger boardings (or enplanements) in calendar year 2005 and 266 enplanements in 2006. The FAA's National Plan of Integrated Airport Systems for 2007–2011 called Scottsdale a reliever airport.

It is one of the busiest single-runway general aviation airports in the nation with 186,514 operations in 2019. The airport does not have commercial scheduled service. The airport offers clearance, ground and tower services from 1300Z to 0400Z (6 am to 9 pm local time) daily.

U.S. Customs service is available daily from 9 am to 7 pm. This allows visitors from all over the world to come to Scottsdale with proper visas.

Neighbors’ complaints about aircraft noise around the airport increased beginning in 2004, peaking in 2005 with over 15,000 complaints being logged. In 2019, complaints decreased significantly to 1,919 complaints. It is unlikely that the airport would close, due to federal grant assurances and its tremendous economic impact.

Scottsdale Airport is an important economic asset for Scottsdale and the region, contributing hundreds of millions of dollars in economic output. Aviation activity at the airport and in the surrounding airpark created $688 million in total economic benefits for the region in FY2019, with aviation activity supporting around 3,979 jobs. Economic benefits of $1.9 million are created daily.

History 
During World War II the airfield was used by the United States Army Air Forces Army Air Forces Training Command as "Thunderbird Field #2" on June 22, 1942, as a primary flight training school for aviation cadets. Since its inception, Thunderbird #2 graduated more than 5,500 students, three times the total contemplated by the AAF's original expansion program. Thunderbird #2 pilots flew nearly 26,500,000 miles, more than 3,000 times around the world at the equator. The school was deactivated on October 16, 1944.

While in operation, Thunderbird #2 underwent a transformation that took it from a small piece of isolated desert to a primary training school. This transformation is attributable to Air Force officers such as General Henry H. Arnold and Lieutenant General B.K. Yount (commander of the Army Air Forces Training Command, and the civilian contract school operated by Leland Hayward and John H. Connelly.

One of three of Southwest Airways' training schools in the Valley, Thunderbird #2's first class of cadets, arriving before the field was pronounced ready for occupancy, had to be trained at Thunderbird Field #1 in Glendale. Not until July 22, could all personnel, consisting then of 28 flight instructors, move to Scottsdale. Throughout World War II, Thunderbird #2 devoted its every facility to the training of more and more cadets. In November 1943, the peak was reached; 615 cadets who flew an average of two hours a day, making 1,845 separate takeoffs and landings. In a period of ten weeks, students received a total of 65 hours of flight training and 109 hours of ground school. In spite of the intensified training, the field gained a widespread reputation for thoroughness of instruction and high caliber graduates.

An increase in the number of students brought about a similar gain in the number of persons employed, until in January, 1944, Thunderbird II's payroll boasted 508 employees, with a total monthly salary expenditure of $115,247. Gradually the tempo slowed as World War II came to an end. So well did civilian contractors complete their initial assignment, that by August 4, 1944, only 40 of the original 64 primary schools were still in operation. At the closing of Thunderbird #2, only 15 remained opened to complete the task of primary training.

After the war, Arizona State Teachers College (now Arizona State University in Tempe, Arizona), acquired the airport in order to implement its own aviation program. Distance from the college campus and cost of operating an aviation program soon convinced the college to abandon its plans.

The Arizona Conference of Seventh-day Adventists bought the airport in 1953 and founded Thunderbird Academy. In 1966, the city of Scottsdale bought the airfield portion of the academy's property from the Seventh-day Adventist Church, and the city continues to own and operate it since.

The airport's master plan does not currently allow commercial flights due to noise concerns.

Facilities

In 2005 the airport had 224,684 aircraft operations, average 615 per day: 95% general aviation, 5% air taxi and <1% military. 471 aircraft are based at this airport: 59% single engine, 19% multi-engine, 20% jet and 2% helicopters. In 2019, the airport had 186,514 aircraft operations. More than 195,800 operations in 2020.

There are three main fixed-base operators located on the field, Jet Aviation Scottsdale (NEW), Signature Flight Support, and Ross Aviation (formerly Corporate Jets). The Scottsdale Fire Department maintains a facility next to the tower. Scottsdale Airport is also home to Civil Air Patrol Squadrons 314 and 310, assisting in field missions upon request.

See also

 Arizona World War II Army Airfields
 37th Flying Training Wing (World War II)

References

 
 Manning, Thomas A. (2005), History of Air Education and Training Command, 1942–2002. Office of History and Research, Headquarters, AETC, Randolph AFB, Texas  
 Shaw, Frederick J. (2004), Locating Air Force Base Sites, History’s Legacy, Air Force History and Museums Program, United States Air Force, Washington DC.

External links

Scottsdale Airport at City of Scottsdale website
 Scottsdale Airport (SDL) at Arizona DOT airport directory
 
 

Airfields of the United States Army Air Forces in Arizona
USAAF Contract Flying School Airfields
Transportation in Scottsdale, Arizona
Buildings and structures in Scottsdale, Arizona
Airports in Maricopa County, Arizona
USAAF Western Flying Training Command
American Theater of World War II